Pinheiros is a municipality located in the Brazilian state of Espírito Santo. Its population was 27,327 (2020) and its area is 975 km².  The capital of this municipality is located at an altitude of 130 meters above sea level.

The municipality contains the  Córrego do Veado Biological Reserve, a strictly protected area named after the Veado River, which flows through the reserve from west to east.

References

Municipalities in Espírito Santo